This article lists the winners and nominees for the Black Reel Award for Outstanding Original Song. It's presented to the performer and songwriters for the best original song written specially for a film. Performers who also wrote the song is credited with one win or nomination.

History
This award was first introduced as Outstanding Original or Adapted song from 2001 - 2013. At the 14th Annual Black Reel Awards the category was renamed to Outstanding Original Song only allowing original songs written specifically for a film to be eligible.

This award was first presented at the 2nd Annual Black Reel Awards where Meshell Ndegeocello's "Fool of Me" from Love & Basketball won.

John Legend holds the record with the most wins as both a performer and songwriter with 3 wins. Legend is the most nominated songwriter in this category with 6 nominations and tied with Beyonce for the most nominations as a performer with 5 nominations.

Other multiple winners in this category includes Raphael Saadiq, Mary J. Blige & Common (rapper).

Love & Basketball, The Brothers, Brown Sugar, Dreamgirls, The Princess and the Frog, The Butler, Creed, Black Panther, Queen & Slim & The Harder They Fall are the only films to receive 2 or more nominations in this category. The Butler, Creed & The Harder They Fall are the only films to not have one of their songs win.

Winners and nominees
Winners are listed first and highlighted in bold.

2000s

2010s

2020s

Multiple nominations and wins (Performer)

Multiple wins
 3 Wins
 John Legend

 2 Wins
 Common
 Mary J. Blige

Multiple nominations

 6 Nominations 
 Beyoncé

 5 Nominations
 John Legend

 4 Nominations
 Pharrell Williams
 Common
 Jennifer Hudson
 Alicia Keys
 Jay Z

 3 Nominations
 Mary J. Blige
 Ludacris
 Kendrick Lamar
 Anika Noni Rose
 Pharrell Williams

 2 Nominations
 Joe Budden
Andra Day
 H.E.R.
 Snoop Dogg
 The Weeknd
 R. Kelly
 Kanye West

Multiple nominations and wins (Songwriter)

Multiple wins
 3 Wins
 John Legend

 2 Wins
 Common
 Mary J. Blige
 Raphael Saadiq

Multiple nominations

 6 Nominations 
 John Legend

 5 Nominations
 Beyoncé
 Common
 Raphael Saadiq

 4 Nominations
 Jay Z
 Pharrell Williams

 3 Nominations
 Mary J. Blige
 Henry Krieger
 Alicia Keys
 Ludacris
 Kendrick Lamar
 R. Kelly
 Diane Warren

 2 Nominations
 Joe Budden
 Snoop Dogg
 Eminem
 Tom Eyen
 Ludwig Goransson
 H.E.R.
 Jimmy Jam
 Ne-Yo
 Terry Lewis
 Randy Newman
 R. Kelly
 Jeymes Samuel
 Taura Stinson
 The Weeknd
 Kanye West

References

Black Reel Awards
Film awards for Best Song